Extenuating Circumstances (French: Circonstances atténuantes) is a 1939 French comedy film directed by Jean Boyer and starring Michel Simon, Suzanne Dantès and Arletty.

It was shot at the Joinville Studios in Paris. The film's sets were designed by the art director Jacques Colombier.

Synopsis
A retired judge known for his harsh views on law and order, leaves for a seaside holiday with his wife. However just outside Paris their car breaks down and they are forced to spend the night in a hotel which is a notorious haunt for criminals.

Cast
 Michel Simon as M. Gaetan Le Sentencier, 'La Sentence'
 Suzanne Dantès as Mme Nathalie Le Sentencier
 Dorville as Jules Le Bouic
 Arletty as Marie Qu'a-d'ça
 François Simon as La poupée 
 Andrex as Môme de Dieu 
 Robert Arnoux as Gabriel, the chauffeur
 Jeanine Roger as Gabriel's Girlfriend
 Robert Ozanne as Cinq de Canne
 Georges Lannes as Coup de Châsse 
 Liliane Lesaffre as Lontine Le Bouic
 Mila Parély as La Panthère
 Émile Saint-Ober as Coco

References

Bibliography 
 Dayna Oscherwitz & MaryEllen Higgins. The A to Z of French Cinema. Scarecrow Press, 2009.

External links 
 

1939 films
French comedy films
1939 comedy films
1930s French-language films
Films directed by Jean Boyer
Films shot at Joinville Studios
Films set in Paris
1930s French films